Butyrometer is a measuring instrument used to measure fat content in milk or milk products in general. The method used in the determination is Gerber's method as invented by Swiss chemist Niklaus Gerber.

External links 
 ISO spec.
 Method for determination

Measuring instruments